Eta Capricorni, Latinized from η Capricorni, is a binary star system in the southern constellation of Capricornus. It can be seen with the naked eye, having a combined apparent visual magnitude of +4.84. Based upon an annual parallax shift of 20.20 mas as seen from the Earth, the star is located about 161 light years from the Sun.

The pair orbit each other with a period of 27.85 years, a semimajor axis of 0.265 arc seconds, an eccentricity of 0.410. The primary member, component A, is a white-hued A-type main sequence star with an apparent magnitude of +5.02. Its companion, component B, has an apparent magnitude of +7.39.

Nomenclature
η Capricorni (Latinised to Eta Capricorni) is the system's Bayer designation.  It also has the Flamsteed designation 22 Capricorni.

Sometimes, this star is called by the name Armus in an astrological context.

References

A-type main-sequence stars
F-type main-sequence stars
Binary stars
Zhou yī
Capricornus (constellation)
Capricorni, Eta
Durchmusterung objects
Capricorni, 22
200499
104019
8060